Aliuska López (Aliuska Yanira López Pedroso; born August 29, 1969) is a Spanish athlete of Cuban origin. She competes mostly in hurdling. The world junior champion from 1988, she is still the world junior record holder at 100 metres hurdles. She was a very successful athlete while competing for her birthcountry Cuba, later switching nationality to Spain.

López is the cousin of long jumper Iván Pedroso.

Personal bests 
 100 metres hurdles – 12.67 (1996)
 100 metres – 11.53 (1987)
 200 metres – 24.22 (1987)

International competitions

Note: At the World Cup in both 1992 and 1994, Lopez was representing the Americas Continent.

References 

 

1969 births
Living people
Spanish female hurdlers
Spanish female sprinters
Cuban female hurdlers
Cuban female sprinters
Olympic athletes of Cuba
Athletes (track and field) at the 1992 Summer Olympics
Athletes (track and field) at the 1996 Summer Olympics
Athletes (track and field) at the 2000 Summer Olympics
Pan American Games gold medalists for Cuba
Pan American Games bronze medalists for Cuba
Pan American Games medalists in athletics (track and field)
Athletes (track and field) at the 1987 Pan American Games
Athletes (track and field) at the 1991 Pan American Games
Athletes (track and field) at the 1995 Pan American Games
Athletes (track and field) at the 1999 Pan American Games
Competitors at the 1990 Central American and Caribbean Games
Competitors at the 1993 Central American and Caribbean Games
Central American and Caribbean Games gold medalists for Cuba
World Athletics Championships athletes for Cuba
Olympic athletes of Spain
Athletes (track and field) at the 2004 Summer Olympics
Athletes (track and field) at the 2005 Mediterranean Games
Cuban emigrants to Spain
Universiade medalists in athletics (track and field)
Goodwill Games medalists in athletics
Universiade silver medalists for Cuba
World Athletics Indoor Championships winners
Central American and Caribbean Games medalists in athletics
Medalists at the 1987 Summer Universiade
Competitors at the 1994 Goodwill Games
Medalists at the 1987 Pan American Games
Medalists at the 1991 Pan American Games
Medalists at the 1995 Pan American Games
Medalists at the 1999 Pan American Games
Mediterranean Games competitors for Spain